Click Airways was an airline based in Sharjah, United Arab Emirates. It was established in 2004 and its main base was Sharjah International Airport.

The airline was on the List of air carriers banned in the European Union.

Destinations
At 6 May 2007 Click Airways was operating services from Sharjah to:

Afghanistan
Bagram - Bagram Air Base
Kabul - Kabul International Airport
Kandahar - Kandahar International Airport
Djibouti
Djibouti City - Ambouli Airport
Iraq
Baghdad - Baghdad International Airport

Fleet
The Click Airways fleet consisted of the following aircraft (at March 2007):

2 Antonov An-12 Cub
1 Ilyushin Il-76MD Candid
1 ashok Il-76TD Candid

References

Defunct airlines of the United Arab Emirates
Airlines established in 2004
Cargo airlines
Emirati companies established in 2004